Simple shear is a deformation in which parallel planes in a material remain parallel and maintain a constant distance, while translating relative to each other.

In fluid mechanics 

In fluid mechanics, simple shear is a special case of deformation where only one component of velocity vectors has a non-zero value:

And the gradient of velocity is constant and perpendicular to the velocity itself:

,

where  is the shear rate and:

The displacement gradient tensor Γ for this deformation has only one nonzero term:

The mathematical model representing simple shear is a shear mapping restricted to the physical limits. It is an elementary linear transformation represented by a matrix. The model may represent laminar flow velocity at varying depths of a long channel with constant cross-section. Limited shear deformation is also used in vibration control, for instance base isolation of buildings for limiting earthquake damage.

In solid mechanics 

In solid mechanics, a simple shear deformation is defined as an isochoric plane deformation in which there are a set of line elements with a given reference orientation that do not change length and orientation during the deformation.  This deformation is differentiated from a pure shear by virtue of the presence of a rigid rotation of the material. When rubber deforms under simple shear, its stress-strain behavior is approximately linear. A rod under torsion is a practical example for a body under simple shear.

If e1 is the fixed reference orientation in which line elements do not deform during the deformation and e1 − e2 is the plane of deformation, then the deformation gradient in simple shear can be expressed as

We can also write the deformation gradient as

Simple shear stress–strain relation 
In linear elasticity, shear stress, denoted , is related to shear strain, denoted , by the following equation:

where  is the shear modulus of the material, given by

Combining gives

See also 
 Deformation (mechanics)
 Infinitesimal strain theory
 Finite strain theory
 Pure shear

References 

Fluid mechanics
Continuum mechanics